Nayiga Florence Ssekabira is a Ugandan female politician, former State Minister for PWDs and  Women Member of Parliament of Kayunga district in the eighth parliament on National Resistance Movement (NRM) political party ticket.

Political career 
Florence Nayiga Sekabira was the Honourable Minister of State for Elderly and Disability Affairs from 2001 to 2006, She won (was elected) National Woman Disability Member of Parliament after defeating Sophia Nalule, her competitor. Florence Nayiga Sekabira represented women of Kayunga in the eighth parliament but lost her seat to Hon. Nantaba Aidah Erios in the ninth parliament.

Political contributions 
State minister for the elderly and disability Florence Nayiga Sekabira advocated for the rights of persons with disabilities. Hon. Nayiga Florence Ssekabira distributed wealth creation capital such as seedlings  to the people in Kayunga.

See also 
 Parliament of Uganda
 List of members of the eighth Parliament of Uganda
 Politics of Uganda
 Cabinet of Uganda

References 

Living people
Members of the Parliament of Uganda
Women members of the Parliament of Uganda
People from Kayunga District
Year of birth missing (living people)